Snapshot is the third album by country music singer Sylvia. People Magazine reviewed it on 6.27.83:
"Recently voted the Academy of Country Music's top female vocalist, Sylvia has a hot single (the title track) to go with the gold records she collected for last year's single "Nobody" and her album, Just Sylvia. She just might be the hottest thing to hit Nashville since Tootsie's Orchid Lounge. This album should consolidate her position nicely. Much of the material was written by Rhonda Kye Fleming and Dennis Morgan. That includes "Snapshot," a betrayed-wife tune; "Bobby's in Vicksburg," a contemporary Civil War ditty; a pleasant love song, "Jason" (written with Mack David); and "Tonight (I'm Gettin' Friendly with the Blues)". Sylvia is among the most restrained of today's women country singers. She'll never stun anyone with her vocal agility, but she always sings with control, feeling and grace."

Track listing
"Snapshot" (Kye Fleming, Dennis Morgan) - 3:41
"Tonight I'm Getting Friendly With The Blues" (William T. Davidson) - 2:53
"Winter Heart" (Fleming, Morgan) - 3:29
"Bobby's in Vicksburg" (Fleming, Morgan) - 3:29
"Gone But Not Forgotten" (Fleming, Morgan) - 3:31
"The Boy Gets Around" (Fleming, Morgan) - 3:27
"Who's Kidding Who" (Davidson, Charles Quillen) - 3:25
"Jason" (Fleming, Morgan, Mack David) - 4:12
"So Complete" (Fleming, Morgan, Karen Charlton) - 3:14
"I Never Quite Got Back (From Loving You)" (Mike Reid, Don Pfrimmer) - 3:33

Chart performance

References

1983 albums
Sylvia (singer) albums
RCA Records albums
Albums produced by Tom Collins (record producer)